Another Year is a 2010 British comedy-drama film written and directed by Mike Leigh and starring Lesley Manville, Jim Broadbent, and Ruth Sheen. It premiered at the 2010 Cannes Film Festival in competition for the Palme d'Or. It was shown at the 54th London Film Festival before its general British release on 5 November 2010. At the 83rd Academy Awards, Mike Leigh was nominated for an Oscar for Best Original Screenplay.

Plot
Tom Hepple, a geologist, and Gerri Hepple, a counsellor, are an older married couple who have a comfortable, loving relationship. The film observes them over the course of the four seasons of a year, surrounded by family and friends who mostly suffer some degree of unhappiness.

Gerri's friend and colleague, Mary, works as a receptionist at the health centre. She is a middle-aged divorcee seeking a new relationship, and despite telling everyone she is happy, appears desperate and depressed, and seems to drink too much. The Hepples' only child, Joe, is 30 and unmarried and works as a solicitor giving advice on housing.

In the summer, the Hepples are visited by Ken, Tom's old friend from his student days. Ken is overweight, eats, smokes and drinks compulsively and seems very unhappy. Tom and Gerri host a barbecue in his honour. Mary drives her newly bought car to the party, but gets lost and arrives late. Having had some wine, she flirts with Joe, whom she has known since he was little. He remains friendly but does not reciprocate. After the party, Mary reluctantly gives Ken a lift to the train station. He makes a clumsy romantic advance and Mary irritably rejects him.

Months later, in the autumn, Mary is once again at Tom and Gerri's home. Joe arrives with Katie, a new girlfriend. Mary appears rude and hostile towards Katie, which Tom and Gerri don't appreciate, creating a rift between Gerri and Mary.

In the winter, Tom, Gerri, and Joe attend the funeral for the wife of Tom's brother Ronnie. Towards the end of the service, Ronnie's estranged son Carl arrives, and angrily asks why the ceremony was not delayed for him. At the reception at Ronnie's house, Carl becomes aggressive and walks out. Tom and Gerri invite Ronnie back to London to stay with them for a while and Ronnie agrees.

While Tom and Gerri are at their garden allotment, Mary arrives unannounced at their home and persuades Ronnie to let her in. Her car has just been wrecked and she is upset. They have a cup of tea and a desultory chat before Mary takes a nap on the settee. When Tom and Gerri return, they are unhappy to find Mary there. Gerri explains to Mary that she feels let down by her earlier behaviour towards Katie. Mary apologises and weeps. Gerri gradually extends a degree of warmth to Mary, suggesting she should seek counseling and inviting her to stay for dinner, and the two women set the table. Joe and Katie arrive, their relationship still appearing strong and happy. The Hepples enjoy dinner together. Mary eats with them but appears lost and uncertain.

Cast
 Jim Broadbent as Tom Hepple
 Ruth Sheen as Gerri Hepple
 Lesley Manville as Mary Smith
 Peter Wight as Ken
 Oliver Maltman as Joe Hepple
 David Bradley as Ronnie Hepple
 Karina Fernandez as Katie
 Martin Savage as Carl Hepple
 Michele Austin as Tanya
 Philip Davis as Jack
 Stuart McQuarrie as Tom's colleague
 Imelda Staunton as Janet

Production
Because the director's usual producer Simon Channing-Williams died in 2009, Another Year was produced by Georgina Lowe, who had worked regularly on Mike Leigh films since Naked (1993). Thin Man Films led the production together with television channel Film4 and Focus Features International. The project received £1.2 million from the UK Film Council. The production involved a budget of around US$8 million, which Leigh said was "the lowest budget I've had for a long time".

Most of Another Years key cast members had already worked with the director multiple times. Leigh collaborated with the actors for five months to create their characters and world and to do research. The director employed his usual technique: the actors improvise extensively during rehearsals, and the result of those improvisations becomes the basis of the final script. Principal photography took 12 weeks. To simulate the four seasons of a year, cinematographer Dick Pope used four different film stocks, and much attention was paid to details in the props so that the passage of time would appear believable.

The location used for Tom and Gerri Hepple's house is St Margaret's Road, Wanstead, East London.

Reception
Another Year has a score of 80/100 on Metacritic based on 35 reviews, indicating "generally favorable reviews". On review aggregator Rotten Tomatoes, the film holds an approval rating of 93% based on 174 reviews, with an average rating of 8.16/10. The website's critical consensus reads, "Characterized by strong performances and the director's trademark feel for the nuances of everyday life, Another Year marks another solid entry in Mike Leigh's career of kitchen-sink English drama." The film debuted at the 2010 Cannes Film Festival in competition for the Palme d'Or and although it failed to receive any prizes, it was highly praised by critics, scoring a 3.4/4 average at Screen International's annual Cannes Jury Grid, which polls international film critics from publications such as Sight & Sound, Positif, L'Unità and Der Tagesspiegel.

Wendy Ide of The Times described the film as "Leigh at his confident best" and "a disarmingly humane work", writing, "Mike Leigh shows admirable restraint: there are no manufactured crescendos, just a melancholy refrain that builds to its raw realisation in an achingly sad final shot." Xan Brooks of The Guardian described Another Year as "a rare treat", and Geoffrey Macnab of The Independent described the film as "an acutely well-observed study of needy and unhappy people desperately trying to make sense of their lives."

Keith Uhlich of Time Out New York named Another Year the eighth-best film of 2010.

Accolades

References

External links
 
 
 
 

2010 films
2010 comedy-drama films
British comedy-drama films
2010s English-language films
Films directed by Mike Leigh
Films about alcoholism
Films shot in London
British independent films
Film4 Productions films
Focus Features films
Sony Pictures Classics films
2010 independent films
2010s British films